K14SC-D, virtual channel 39 (UHF digital channel 14), is a low-powered television station licensed to Ashland, Oregon, United States. The station is owned by Watch TV, Inc.

External links
WatchTV, Inc.

Television channels and stations established in 1996
Low-power television stations in the United States
14SC-D
1996 establishments in Oregon